William Henry Howe (22 November 1846 in Ravenna, Ohio – 16 March 1929 in Bronxville, New York) was an American painter active in Bronxville.

Howe was a student of Otto de Thoren and Vuillefroy. He first worked in Paris, where he painted scenes from the rustic life in Normandy.

Howe received many awards, notably a third-class medal at the Paris Salon of 1888; the Temple Gold Medal from the Pennsylvania Academy of the Fine Arts in 1890; a medal at the World's Columbian Exposition in Chicago in 1893; bronze medal at the Cotton States and International Exposition in Atlanta in 1895; and a silver medal at the Pan-American Exposition in Buffalo in 1901.

He was elected a member of the National Academy in 1897 and made a Chevalier of the Legion of Honor in 1899.
According to Howe's Biographer, “His paintings were honest transcripts from nature, faithfully cooked up from many studies and sketches from objective observations, however he knew his cattle so well that France decorated him with the [Cross of the] Legion of Honor.”

Howe was part of the Old Lyme Art Colony centered at Florence Griswold's boardinghouse in Old Lyme, Connecticut.  Howe there played the role of the benign "Uncle," as the younger artists called him.

See also
List of American painters exhibited at the 1893 World's Columbian Exposition

References

Further reading

Benezit Dictionary of Artists, Gründ, 2006,  vol. 7
"William Henry Howe: A Chief of Cattle-Painters," The Art World, vol. 3, no. 1 (Oct., 1917), pp. 4–6.

19th-century American painters
American male painters
20th-century American painters
Chevaliers of the Légion d'honneur
1846 births
1929 deaths
19th-century American male artists
20th-century American male artists
Members of the American Academy of Arts and Letters